Franz Altheim (6 October 1898 – 17 October 1976) was a German classical philologist and historian who specialized in the history of classical antiquity. During the 1930s and 1940s, Altheim served the Nazi state as a member of Ahnenerbe, a think tank controlled by the Schutzstaffel (SS), the paramilitary wing of the Nazi Party, and as a spy for the SS.

Early life and education
Franz Altheim was born in Frankfurt, Germany on 6 October 1898. His father was the painter Wilhelm Altheim. Altheim's mother left his father due to his heavy drinking and unconventional lifestyle. Depressed as a result, Wilhelm Altheim died by suicide on Christmas 1914. Altheim studied classical philology and history at the University of Frankfurt beginning in 1916. During World War I in 1917, he joined the German Army, first attending a school for translators and then serving as a translator in Turkey. After the war, he tried and failed to become a sculptor before returning to school, supporting himself by working in a bank. Altheim majored in classical philology, archaeology, and linguistics. While in school, he traveled to Italy several times with the aid of government grants to study classical civilization. He earned his PhD at the University of Frankfurt in December 1921. His dissertation, Die Komposition der Politik des Aristoteles, was supervised by Hans von Arnim. Altheim received a scholarship from the Notgemeinschaft der Deutschen Wissenschaft in 1925, and gained his habilitation in 1928 with the thesis Griechische Götter im alten Rom, which was supervised by Walter F. Otto. During this time, Altheim became acquainted with Károly Kerényi and Leo Frobenius. Altheim was introduced to the deposed German emperor Wilhelm II, possibly by Frobenius. Wilhelm was then living at Doorn, Netherlands, where Altheim became a frequent visitor.  Altheim was also a member of the George-Kreis.

Career
Altheim worked as a private lecturer at the University of Frankfurt from 1928 to 1935. He supplemented his income as a private art dealer. He initially appeared indifferent to the Nazis, who came to power in 1933. As the Nazis restricted academic freedom, Altheim was increasingly criticized by party officials and students and professors supportive of the party for failure to integrate Nazi ideology into his teaching. In 1935, a colleague wrote a letter to the Nazi Ministry of Education attacking Altheim for not incorporating Nazi doctrine into his work. This letter nearly prevented his appointment in 1936 as Associate Professor of Classical Philology at the University of Frankfurt. In the winter of 1936 he briefly served as Acting Chair of Classical Philology at the University of Halle. In 1937, Altheim was Associate Professor of Classical Philology at the University of Halle.

A member of the Sturmabteilung, Altheim conducted research projects with Ahnenerbe financing in the 1930s. With his partner Erika Trautmann, Altheim went on research expeditions to Italy, Sweden, Romania and the Middle East, during which he prepared reports for the Sicherheitsdienst. In 1943, Altheim was appointed Professor of Classical Philology at the University of Halle. His research centered on the history of classical antiquity, and many of his monographs on this subject were translated into other languages.

Altheim was dismissed from the University of Halle after World War II, but was soon reinstated. In 1948 he was appointed Professor of Ancient History at the University of Halle. In 1950, Altheim was appointed Chair of Ancient History at the newly created Free University of Berlin. After retiring in 1964, Altheim moved to Münster, where he died on 17 October 1976. He was survived by Ruth Altheim-Stiehl, his student and adoptive daughter.

Selected works
 Griechische Götter im alten Rom, 1930
 Terra Mater, 1931
 Römische Religionsgeschichte, 1931-1933
 Epochen der römischen Geschichte, 1934-1935
 Lex sacrata, 1939
 Die Soldatenkaiser, 1939
 (with Erika Trautmann): Vom Ursprung der Runen, 1939
 (with Erika Trautmann): Italien und die dorische Wanderung, 1940
 Italien und Rom, 1941
 Rom und der Hellenismus, 1942
 Helios und Heliodor von Emesa, 1942
 (with Erika Trautmann-Nehring): Kimbern und Runen. Untersuchungen zur Ursprungsfrage der Runen, 1942
 Die Krise der alten Welt im 3. Jahrhundert n. Zw. und ihre Ursachen, 1943
 Goten und Finnen im dritten und vierten Jahrhundert, 1944
 Weltgeschichte Asiens im griechischen Zeitalter, 1947–1948
 Römische Geschichte, 1948-1958
 Literatur und Gesellschaft im ausgehenden Altertum, 1948–1950
 Der Ursprung der Etrusker, 1950
 Roman und Dekadenz, 1951
 Geschichte der lateinischen Sprache, 1951
 Aus Spätantike und Christentum, 1951
 Attila und die Hunnen, 1951
 Niedergang der alten Welt, 1952
 (with Ruth Stiehl): Asien und Rom, 1952
 Alexander und Asien, 1953
 Gesicht vom Abend und Morgen, 1954
 (with Ruth Stiehl): Ein asiatischer Staat, 1954
 Reich gegen Mitternacht, 1955
 Der unbesiegte Gott, 1957
 Utopie und Wirtschaft, 1957
 (with Ruth Stiehl): Finanzgeschichte der Spätantike, 1957
 (with Ruth Stiehl): Philologia sacra, 1958
 (with Ruth Stiehl): Die aramäische Sprache unter den Achaimeniden, 1959–1963
 Geschichte der Hunnen, 1959-1962
 Zarathustra und Alexander, 1960
 Entwicklungshilfe im Altertum, 1962
 Die Araber in der alten Welt, 1964-1969
 (with Ruth Stiehl): Geschichte Mittelasiens im Altertum, 1970
 (with Ruth Stiehl): Christentum am Roten Meer, 1971–1973

See also
 Károly Kerényi
 Mircea Eliade

References

Sources
 Ernst Baltrusch: Altheim, Franz. In: Peter Kuhlmann, Helmuth Schneider (Hrsg.): Geschichte der Altertumswissenschaften. Biographisches Lexikon (= Der Neue Pauly. Supplemente. Vol. 6). Metzler, Stuttgart/Weimar 2012, Sp. 24 f.
 

1898 births
1976 deaths
20th-century German historians
Academic staff of the Free University of Berlin
German classical philologists
German male non-fiction writers
Goethe University Frankfurt alumni
Academic staff of Goethe University Frankfurt
Academic staff of the Martin Luther University of Halle-Wittenberg
Ahnenerbe members